Sopje is a municipality in Croatia in the Virovitica–Podravina County. As of a 2001 census, Sopje had a population of 2,750.

At the time of Ancient Rome, there was a salt lake called Salapia somewhere in Interamnia (modern-day Slavonia). It's been suggested that the name Sopje derives from its name.

References

External links
 Sopje Municipality Website in Croatian

Populated places in Virovitica-Podravina County
Municipalities of Croatia